The Teenage Textbook is a novel by the Singaporean author Adrian Tan, first published by Hotspot Books in 1988. The book was a bestseller in Singapore, and was followed by a sequel, The Teenage Workbook, in 1989. The books followed the life of a female student named Mui Ee, studying at the fictitious Paya Lebar Junior College in Singapore. The two books sold over 50,000 copies. Tan wrote the books while he was an undergraduate law student at the National University of Singapore.

In 2015, The Teenage Textbook was selected by The Business Times as one of the Top 10 English Singapore books from 1965–2015, alongside titles by Arthur Yap and Daren Shiau.

Adaptations
In 1997, The Teenage Textbook was made into a stage play by The Necessary Stage, starring Hossan Leong and Mark Richmond. In 1998, it was also made into a film, The Teenage Textbook Movie, starring Melody Chen and Caleb Goh, which topped the box office in Singapore for four weeks. 

In 2021, the book was reimagined by Drew Pan as a TV series titled Teenage Textbook – The Series, on Channel 5, starring Ong Yi Xuan, Chen Yixin, and Chris Mak.

References

External links 
 Interview with Adrian Tan

Singaporean novels
Novels set in Singapore
1988 novels